Wushu was contested at the 2017 Summer Universiade from August 26 to 29 at the Hsinchu County Gymnasium in Zhubei, Hsinchu County, Taiwan.

Medal summary

Medal table

Men's taolu

Men's sanda

Women's taolu

Women's sanda

References

External links
2017 Summer Universiade – Wushu
Result book – Wushu

2017 in wushu (sport)
2017 Summer Universiade events
Wushu at the Summer Universiade